Kedist Deltour (born 29 July 1997) is a Belgian model and beauty pageant titleholder who was crowned Miss Belgium 2021. As Miss Belgium, she represented Belgium at Miss Universe 2021, where she failed to enter the top 16.

Early life
Deltour was born in Addis Ababa in Ethiopia. When she was eight years old, her mother died of cancer. Afterwards, her father remarried; Deltour's stepmother was physically abusive, and when she was nine years old, her father left her and her siblings in an orphanage. At age ten, she and her siblings were adopted by a Belgian couple Peter and Nadège Deltour, and moved to Woesten in West Flanders. In Belgium, Deltour completed vocational training to become a hairdresser, and later moved to Nazareth in East Flanders.

Pageantry
Deltour began her career in pageantry in 2020, after she was crowned Miss East Flanders 2021, besting first runner-up Laura Baeyans. As Miss East Flanders, Deltour received the right to represent the province at Miss Belgium 2021. The Miss Belgium finals were held on 31 March 2021 in Adinkerke, without an audience due to the COVID-19 pandemic. Deltour first advanced into the top 22, then the top fifteen, until being announced as the winner; this made her the eighth consecutive Flemish woman to win the title.

As Miss Belgium, Deltour represented Belgium at Miss Universe 2021. Additionally, as part of her prize package, Deltour received a pink Volvo.

References

External links

1997 births
Belgian adoptees
Belgian beauty pageant winners
Belgian female models
Belgian people of Ethiopian descent
Ethiopian emigrants to Belgium
Living people
Miss Belgium winners
People from Nazareth, Belgium
Miss Universe 2021 contestants